Rips is a location in the southeastern part of Albania where a secondary border crossing point between Albania and Greece is situated.

References 

Albania–Greece border crossings